Orange County is a 2002 American comedy film starring Colin Hanks and Jack Black. It was released on January 11, 2002. The movie was distributed by Paramount Pictures and produced by MTV Productions and Scott Rudin. The movie was directed by Jake Kasdan and written by Mike White.

Plot
Teen Shaun Brumder is intelligent, but little interested in his education, leading a carefree SoCal lifestyle of surfing in affluent Orange County, California, drinking, and partying. His best friend Lonny is killed in a surfing accident, leading Shaun to rethink his life. Finding a novel on the beach by Marcus Skinner, it inspires him to become a writer. Upon learning that Skinner is an English professor at Stanford University, Shaun makes it his goal to attend Stanford and study under him.

Shaun dramatically improves himself academically, obtaining high grades and SAT scores and becoming president of his graduating class. Following the advice of his guidance counselor, Ms. Cobb, Shaun applies only to Stanford. This backfires when he is rejected as Ms. Cobb mixed up his transcript with that of another student. 

Reaching out to his wealthy father Bud, who left his family for a much younger woman, Shaun pleads with him to donate to Stanford to increase his chances of acceptance. Disapproving of his dream to become a writer, Bud refuses. Shaun's girlfriend Ashley convinces her friend Tanya to get Shaun an interview at his home by Tanya's grandfather, a Stanford board member. Unfortunately, the antics of Shaun’s dysfunctional family members (his alcoholic, emotionally fragile mother Cindy and his dim-witted stoner brother Lance), cause Shaun's interviewers to storm out in disgust.

In a last-ditch effort, Ashley and Lance convince Shaun to drive to Palo Alto and plead his case directly to Stanford Admissions Director Don Durkett. By the time they reach campus, the admissions building is closed. While Lance seduces the secretary on duty, Shaun and Ashley find Durkett's home address. There, Shaun impresses Durkett with his real transcript, but Durkett is reluctant to admit him so late in the admissions process. 

After much groveling, Shaun convinces him to give it a second thought. Disaster strikes again when Ashley confuses Lance's MDMA for pain relievers, offering Durkett the pills for his headache, getting him high. Shaun, Ashley, and Durkett return to find the Admissions Building on fire, caused by Lance smoking with the receptionist. With Lance wanted for arson, they abandon Durkett and flee the scene.

Frustrated with Shaun's obsession, Ashley points out that his attending Stanford would likely mean the end of their relationship, and she leaves. Depressed, Shaun wanders the campus and meets a female student who invites him to a frat party. He is disappointed to learn the Stanford coeds are just as vapid as teenagers from Orange County. 

With a more cynical view of college, Shaun runs into Professor Skinner and is invited to his office. Shaun confides that he is afraid his dreams of being a good writer are over. Skinner reminds him that many famous authors such as James Joyce and William Faulkner grew up in places that were not intellectually stimulating, and were inspired by the conflicts in their own lives. Having an epiphany, Shaun realizes his misguided intentions and apologizes to Ashley. They pick up Lance, still hiding from police, and go home.

In Orange County, Shaun's parents seek each other out to deal with Shaun's problem. They reconcile, realizing they are much happier together than with their respective new spouses, and conclude they have not been good parents to Shaun. To make amends, Bud donates enough money to Stanford for the construction of a new Admissions Building, which secures Shaun’s acceptance. 

Initially ecstatic, Shaun remembers what Ashley and Professor Skinner said, and decides to stay in Orange County with Ashley and his family, as they are the true inspiration for his writing. Shaun leaves a copy of Skinner's book at the beach for someone else to find, then surfs with his friends for the first time since Lonny's death.

Cast
 Colin Hanks as Shaun Brumder
 Jack Black as Lance Brumder
 Catherine O'Hara as Cindy Brumder
 Schuyler Fisk as Ashley
 John Lithgow as Bud Brumder
 Harold Ramis as Don Durkett
 Jane Adams as Mona
 Garry Marshall as Arthur Gantner
 Dana Ivey as Vera Gantner
 Carly Pope as Tanya
 Chevy Chase as Principal Harbert
 Lily Tomlin as Charlotte Cobb, College counselor
 Leslie Mann as Krista
 Bret Harrison as Lonny
 Kyle Howard as Arlo
 RJ Knoll as Chad
 George Murdock as Bob Beugler
 Monica Keena as Gretchen
 Fran Kranz as Shane Brainard
 Mike White as Mr. Burke, English teacher
 Sarah Hagan as Sarah
 Lizzy Caplan as Party Girl
 Nat Faxon as Kip
 Alexandra Breckenridge (uncredited) as Anna
 Kevin Kline (Uncredited) as Marcus Skinner
 Ben Stiller (Uncredited) as The Firefighter

Reception
Orange County was given 3 of 4 stars by Roger Ebert, who described it as, "one of those happy projects where everything seems to fall naturally into place. It will sound like the kind of movie that, if you are over 17, you don't usually go to see. But it isn't. It's one of those movies where the description can't do justice to the experience." On Rotten Tomatoes, the film holds a rating 47% based on reviews from 122 critics, with an average rating of 5.2 out of 10. The site's consensus states: "Smarter than the average teen movie, but a little on the unmemorable side." On Metacritic, it has a score of 48% based on reviews from 28 critics. Audiences surveyed by CinemaScore gave the film a grade "B" on scale of A to F.

It garnered a better reception abroad than domestically. Matthew Turner of ViewLondon states that, "though there are no real belly laughs or any Farrelly-like set pieces, this is still a better than average comedy, thanks to its witty script and its amusing collection of characters. Worth watching." while Brian McKay of eFilmCritic.com describes it as, "a notch above the usual tripe we get from MTV films—but it's not a very big notch."

Home media
The film was released on DVD on June 18, 2002, and was re-released in 2017, as well as available in a 3-pack set with School of Rock and Nacho Libre. It was released on Blu-ray for the first time on April 26, 2022.

Soundtrack

The soundtrack was released on 2 discs on December 18, 2001. The movie itself contains 25 credited songs, leaving 9 out of the soundtrack
 "Defy You" - The Offspring
 "Story of My Life" (Live) - Social Distortion
 "The One" - Foo Fighters
 "Shadow Stabbing" - Cake
 "Butterfly" - Crazy Town
 "1st Time" - Bad Ronald 	
 "Lay Down Burden" - Brian Wilson
 "Everything's Cool" - Lit
 "Glad That It's Over" - 12 Rods
 "Stick 'Em Up" - Quarashi
 "Lose You" - Pete Yorn 	
 "Under the Tracks" - Creeper Lagoon
 "Love and Mercy" - Brian Wilson 	
 "California" - Phantom Planet
 "Hello" (hidden track) - Sugarbomb

References

External links

 
 

2002 films
2000s teen comedy films
American teen comedy films
Films about writers
2000s English-language films
American coming-of-age comedy films
Films set in Orange County, California
Films directed by Jake Kasdan
Paramount Pictures films
MTV Films films
Films about fraternities and sororities
Films scored by Michael Andrews
Films produced by Scott Rudin
Films with screenplays by Mike White
2002 comedy films
Films about brothers
2000s American films